The Tingha Advocate and North-Western Journal is an English language newspaper published in Tingha, New South Wales, Australia.  It was published every Friday morning and described itself as being "bright and reliable".

History 
The Tingha Advocate and North-Western Journal was a weekly publication sold for 3 pence.  The original paper consisted primarily of advertising and community news.

Digitisation 
The various versions of the paper have been digitised as part of the Australian Newspapers Digitisation Program project hosted by the National Library of Australia.

See also 
 List of newspapers in New South Wales

References

External links 
 

Defunct newspapers published in New South Wales
Newspapers on Trove
Tingha, New South Wales